In gay culture, a bear is a larger and often hairier man who projects an image of rugged masculinity.

The bear concept can function as an identity or an affiliation, and there is ongoing debate in bear communities about what constitutes a bear. Some bears place importance on presenting a clear masculine image and may disdain or shun men who exhibit effeminacy, while others consider acceptance and inclusivity of all behavioral types to be an important value of the community.

History 

In the mid-1980s, gay men in the San Francisco Bay Area who called themselves "bears" met informally at Bear Hug (sex) parties and via the newly-emerging Internet. The term bear was popularized by Richard Bulger, who, along with his then partner Chris Nelson (1960–2006), founded Bear Magazine in 1987. George Mazzei wrote an article for The Advocate in 1979 called "Who's Who in the Zoo?", that characterized gay men as seven types of animals, including bears.

At the onset of the bear movement, some bears separated from the gay community at large, forming "bear clubs" to create social and sexual opportunities of their own. Many clubs are loosely organized social groups; others are modeled on leather biker-patch clubs, with a strict set of bylaws, membership requirements, and charities. Bear clubs often sponsor large yearly events"bear runs" or "bear gatherings"like the annual events such as Southern HiBearNation in Melbourne, Bear Pride and Bear Essentials in Sydney, Bearstock in Adelaide, HiBearNation in St. Louis, Missouri, SF Bear Weekend, CBL's Bear Hunt, Bear Pride in Chicago, Atlanta Bear Pride, Texas Bear Round Up (TBRU) in Dallas, Orlando Bear Bash, and Bear Week in Provincetown (since 2001), drawing regional, national and international visitors. Many LGBT events attract a significant bear following, such as Southern Decadence in New Orleans.

"Sociology of the Urban Gay Bear", written by Les K. Wright, was the first article to appear in print, in Drummer magazine, edited by Jack Fritscher. Fritscher was the founding editor of San Francisco's California Action Guide (1982). With California Action Guide, Fritscher became the first editor to publish the word bear (with the gay culture meaning) on a magazine cover (November 1982). "Sociology of the Urban Gay Bear", written by Les K. Wright, was the first academic article to appear in print, in Drummer magazine, edited by Jack Fritscher.

As well, with producer Mark Hemry in 1984, Fritscher co-founded the pioneering Palm Drive Video featuring homomasculine entertainment. Palm Drive Video expanded in 1996 to Palm Drive Publishing, San Francisco. For Palm Drive, Fritscher wrote, cast, and directed more than 150 video features. His work includes documentary footage of the first bear contest (Pilsner Inn, February 1987). A bear contest is a feature at many bear events, a sort of masculine beauty pageant awarding titles and sashes (often made of leather) to winners. This footage is no longer for sale, as Fritscher declined to shift to DVD format and shut down the video company.

One example of a bear contest was International Mr. Bear, formerly held each February at the International Bear Rendezvous in San Francisco. It attracted contestants, often with local titles, from all over the world. The first International Mr. Bear was held in 1992, and the last was held in 2011. The contest included Bear, Daddy, Cub, and Grizzly titles with the contestant who received the highest score winning the bear title, regardless of what type he was. Example: "Mr. Washington, D.C. Bear, 2006". Gay "leather-bears" have competed in leather contests, and "muscle-bears" are another subculture noted by their muscular body mass.

The International Bear Brotherhood Flag is the pride flag of the bear community. Craig Byrnes created this flag in 1995.

The Bear History Project, founded by Les L. Wright in 1995, documented the emergence and early evolution of bear identity and bear community. It became the source material for much of The Bear Book (1999) and The Bear Book II (2001). Publication of The Bear Book led to the Library of Congress adding "bear" as a category. The Bear History Project is archived in the Human Sexuality Collection at Cornell University. It continues to be added to.

The bear community has spread all over the world, with bear clubs in many countries. Bear clubs often serve as social and sexual networks for their members, who can contribute to their local gay communities through fund-raising and other functions. Bear events have become very common, to include smaller-sized cities and many rural areas. Most gay oriented campgrounds now include some type of bear-related event during their operating season.

The bear community constitutes a specialty niche in the commercial market. It offers T-shirts and other accessories as well as calendars and porn movies and magazines featuring bear icons, e.g., Jack Radcliffe. Catalina Video has a bear-themed line, the "Furry Features Series". Other adult studios which feature bear-type men are Bear Magazine, 100% BEEF Magazine, BearFilms, Bear, Butch Bear, Raging Stallion, and Titan Media. There are also social media websites and smartphone apps that market to men of the bear community.

As the bear community has matured, so has its music and literature, as well as other (non-pornographic) arts, media, and culture. Examples include Bearapalooza, a traveling bear music festival; Bear Bones Books, an imprint of LGBTQ publisher Lethe Press, which markets fiction, nonfiction, and poetry titles written by and for bears; BearRadio.net, which streams bear and LGBT music and bear-themed podcast shows. "Bear Icons, the first bear-themed art exhibit (1999-2002), toured to Boston, Provincetown, New York City, and Washington, DC. The larger organized bear runs often host a "bear market" area where artisans, musicians, and others offer items for sale.

As more gay men have identified themselves as bears, more bars, especially leather or western bars, have become bear-friendly. Some bars cater specifically to bear patrons.

Characteristics 

Jack Fritscher notes that bears celebrate "secondary sexual characteristics of the male: facial hair, body hair, proportional size, baldness." Since the late 2000s, cisgender women and transgender men with similar characteristics who identify as bears have begun to be recognized in the culture.

Over the years, bear culture has subdivided itself. Many claim discrimination has increased within the bear community, as some men who self-identify as "bears" or "musclebears" do not welcome higher-bodyfat men (see chub) at their events. A common criticism of the bear community is that some self-described bears tend to exclude men who do not fit their standards of a "real bear". Fat (or lack of it) is seen by some as a political issue, some of whom see their overweight condition as a form of self-acceptance. Some also note a lack of racial diversity in the bear community, generally perceiving hirsuteness to be a standard of physical attractiveness that genetically favors white men aesthetically, socially and sexually among bears.

Bear media 
A variety of media has been established specifically to cater to bears. The Internet comic strip Bear with Me centers around the life of the bear Andy McCubbin, a rich entrepreneur and heir to the Howell/McCubbin fortune, and his friends and family. A vast majority of the other characters are also bears. The comics are created by Tim Vanderburg under the pen name Bruin. In Tim Barela's comic strip, Leonard & Larry, a majority of the male characters are bearded men, some self-identified as bears, most not. Another webcomic, Blur the Lines, frequently features bearish men and the two main characters, Rick and Drew, associate with the bear community; the former identifies as a chub, whereas the latter identifies as a chaser/cub. (See below for term definitions.) The events and characters depicted in the strip are inspired by the life of the author and artist, Bob Kusiak, who is also involved to some extent with the bear community.

Films depicting the bear community include BearCity, BearCity 2: The Proposal and Cachorro, and the comedy web series Where the Bears Are, BULK: The Series, and Skeleton Crew.

In 2012, Bear World Magazine was first published online in monthly PDF format. The magazine was the first lifestyle magazine for the bear community, offering an alternative from the beefcake and pornographic magazines in print. Over the years, Bear World Magazine has grown into the world's leading bear lifestyle magazine having transformed into a popular news and magazine website. 
	
In 2013, gay singer-songwriter Tom Goss released his song "Bears", singing about the bear community's open-mindedness and size-inclusivity.

References in popular culture and art 

The International Bear Brotherhood Flag is the pride flag of the bear community. Craig Byrnes created this flag in 1995.

The December 2007 issue of Instinct magazine featured an article by writer and director Kevin Smith on its "The Last Word" page. Smith wrote about his gay brother Don and about his (Kevin's) being on the cover of A Bear's Life magazine and the related cover story, and his feelings about being a "bear icon" in the gay community. Smith later made a cameo appearance in the 2012 film BearCity 2: The Proposal, playing himself in a brief conversation with a main character who works in the film industry.

In the 2015 Pixar movie Inside Out, the character Disgust says there are no bears in San Francisco. The character Anger disagrees, saying, "I saw a really hairy guy. He looked like a bear."

The San Francisco South of Market Leather History Alley consists of four works of art along Ringold Alley honoring leather culture; it opened in 2017. One of the works of art is metal bootprints along the curb which honor 28 people (including T. Michael "Lurch" Sutton, biker and co-founder of the Bears of San Francisco) who were an important part of the leather communities of San Francisco.

Terminology 

Some slang terms relating to the bear community include the following:

 Big BoyAn Afrocentric term for bears, particularly those of African or African American heritage. Similar to chubs, big boy culture may be considered distinct, if related to, bear culture.
 ChubA heavy-set man who might be described as overweight or obese. These men are also a distinct subculture within the gay community, and may or may not identify with the bear movement per se.
 Cub – a younger (or younger-looking) version of a bear, sometimes but not always, with a smaller frame.
 OtterConsidered a subspecies of "bear" by some, an otter is a hairy slim or small-framed man.
 Panda (or Panda bear)A bear of Asian descent.
 Polar bearAn older bear whose facial and body hair is predominantly or entirely white or grey.
 Trans bearA transgender person, typically a trans man or otherwise of transmasculine experience, who is hairy and heavy-set.
 UrsulaA lesbian bear.
 WolfA gay man with body and facial hair, but also a very lean, muscular, athletic build.

International bear events

See also 

 Bearforce 1
 Castro clone
 Circuit party
 Dad bod
 Mythopoetic men's movement
 XXL (club)

References

Further reading 

 Cain, Paul D. and Luke Mauerman (2019). Bears in the Raw. 
 Hennen, Peter (2008). Faeries, Bears, and Leathermen: Men in Community Queering the Masculine. University of Chicago
Hoffman, Wayne (2015). An Older Man. A Novella
 Hörmann, Rainer (2004). Das Bärenkult: Das Tier im Mann.
 
 Kampf, Ray (2000). The Bear Handbook: A Comprehensive Guide for Those Who Are Husky, Hairy and Homosexual, and Those Who Love 'Em. Haworth Press. 
Luczak, Raymoind (2019). Flannelwood.
Luczak, Raymond (2016). The Kiss of Walt Whitman Still on My Lips (2016).
Smith, Travis and Chris Bale (2012). Guide to the Modern Bear.
 Suresha, Ron (2002). Bears on Bears: Interviews and Discussions. Alyson Publications. 
 Wright, Les K. (1997). The Bear Book: Readings in the History and Evolution of a Gay Male Subculture. Haworth Press.

External links 

 
 

 
Fat acceptance movement
Gay masculinity
Gender roles in the LGBT community
LGBT slang
Masculinity
Metaphors referring to bears
Slang terms for men